The Kakuyids (also called Kakwayhids, Kakuwayhids or Kakuyah) were a Shia Muslim dynasty of Daylamite origin that held power in western Persia, Jibal and Kurdistan (c. 1008–c. 1051). They later became atabegs (governors) of Yazd, Isfahan and Abarkuh from c. 1051 to 1141. They were related to the Buyids.

Origins 
Scholars state that the Kakuyids were Daylamites, and relatives of Sayyida Shirin, who was from the Daylamite Bavand dynasty.

History 
The founder of the Kakuyid dynasty was Ala al-Dawla Muhammad, a Daylamite military leader under the service of the Buyid amirate of Jibal. His father, Rustam Dushmanziyar, had also served the Buyids, and was given lands in the Alborz to protect them against the local rulers of the neighbouring region of Tabaristan. Rustam was the uncle of Sayyida Shirin, a princess from the Bavand dynasty who was married to the Buyid amir (ruler) Fakhr al-Dawla. Because of this connection, Ala al-Dawla Muhammad is often referred to as Ibn Kakuya or Pisar-i Kaku, "meaning son of the uncle." By 1008, he was the governor of the city of Isfahan, a position which Sayyida Shirin had secured him. However, the report of the 11th-century local historian of Isfahan, Mafarrukhi, suggests that Ala al-Dawla Muhammad was in control of the city at least as early as 1003. Over time, he effectively became independent of Buyid control.

At times Muhammad ibn Rustam Dushmanziyar acted as an ally of the Buyids; when Shams al-Dawla was faced with a revolt in Hamadan, for example, he turned to the Kakuyids for aid. Shortly after Shams al-Daula died, he was succeeded by Sama' al-Dawla, however, the Kakuyids invaded and took control of Hamadan in 1023 or 1024. They then moved on and seized Hulwan from the 'Annazids. The Buyid Musharrif al-Dawla, who ruled over Fars and Iraq, forced the Kakuyids to withdraw from Hulwan, but they retained Hamadan. Peace was made between the two sides, and a matrimonial alliance was eventually arranged.

Muhammad ibn Rustam Dushmanziyar was succeeded in 1041 by his son Faramurz. While in Hamadan another Kakuyid, Garshasp I, took power. In 1095, Garshasp II became the new emir of the Kakuyid dynasty, and was later killed at the Battle of Qatwan in 1141. Faramurz's reign was cut short by the Seljuks, who after a year-long siege of Isfahan took the city in 1051 or 1052. Despite this, Faramurz was given Yazd and Abarkuh in fief by the Seljuks. The Kakuyids remained the governors of these provinces until sometime in the mid-12th century; their rule during this time was known for the construction of mosques, canals and fortifications.

Kakuyid rulers
 Muhammad ibn Rustam Dushmanziyar (1008–1041)
 Faramurz ibn Muhammad (1041–1070's) – Isfahan, later in Yazd and Abarkuh
 Garshasp I ibn Muhammad (1041–1048) – Hamadan, Nihawand, Borujerd and western Jibal
 Ali ibn Faramurz (1070's –1095) – Yazd. Married Chaghri Beg's daughter, Arslan Khatun Khadija, in 1076–1077.
 Garshasp II (1095–1141)

Family tree

References

Sources